Khmer sculpture refers to the stone sculpture of the Khmer Empire, which ruled a territory based on modern Cambodia, but rather larger, from the 9th to the 13th century. The most celebrated examples are found in Angkor, which served as the seat of the empire.

Styles
There are several recognisable specific art styles of the Angkorian period:
 Kulen style (c.825-875)
 Koh Ker style (941-944)
 Baphuon style (1010-1080)
 Angkor Wat style (1100-1175)
 Bayon style (late 12th to early 13th century)

Movement away from Indian models

Earlier Khmer art were influenced by Indian influences of Hindu themes. By the 7th century, Khmer sculpture begins to drift away from its Hindu influences – pre-Gupta for the Buddhist figures, Pallava for the Hindu figures – and through constant stylistic evolution, it comes to develop its own originality, which by the 10th century can be considered complete and absolute. An example of Khmer style that totally departed from Indian sculpture tradition is the wholeness of its figure, which bears similarities to the ancient Egyptian sculpture.

Unlike almost all of Indian and Javanese Hindu-Buddhist stone sculptures, which were carved in high reliefs, slabs or supported by stelae on the figure's back, Khmer sculpture is carved wholly in the round. Khmer stone sculpture did not employ any stelae on the back of the figure to support it, as the result broken arms, hands or ankles vividly attested to the vulnerability of this format. Nevertheless, Khmer sculptors seems to wish their works to be seen from all sides in the garbagriha in the center of the temple. Khmers attempted to make free-standing statues, supported by an arch or by an attribute of the divinity such as a piece of clothing or a hand-held object.

Khmer sculpture soon goes beyond religious representation, which becomes almost a pretext in order to portray court figures in the guise of gods and goddesses. But furthermore, it also comes to constitute a means and end in itself for the execution of stylistic refinement, like a kind of testing ground. We have already seen how the social context of the Khmer kingdom provides a second key to understanding this art. But we can also imagine that on a more exclusive level, small groups of intellectuals and artists were at work, competing among themselves in mastery and refinement as they pursued a hypothetical perfection of style.

The gods we find in Khmer sculpture are those of the two great religions of India, Buddhism and Hinduism. Priests supervised the execution of the works, attested to in the high iconographic precision of the sculptures. Nonetheless, unlike those Hindu images which repeat an idealized stereotype, these images are treated with great realism and originality because they depict living models: the king and his court. The true social function of Khmer art was, in fact, the glorification of the aristocracy through these images of the gods embodied in the princes. In fact, the cult of the “deva-raja” required the development of an eminently aristocratic art in which the people were supposed to see the tangible proof of the sovereign’s divinity, while the aristocracy took pleasure in seeing itself – if, it’s true, in idealized form – immortalized in the splendour of intricate adornments, elegant dresses and extravagant jewelry.

The sculptures are images of gods, royal and imposing presences with feminine sensuality, giving impressions of figures at the courts with considerable power.  The sculptures represent the chosen divinity in the orthodox manner and succeeds in portraying, with great skill and expertise, high figures of the courts in all of their splendour, in the attire, adornments and jewelry of a sophisticated beauty.

But if we go beyond this initial impression, we can pause to observe some of the details of the sculptures, such as the double arc drawn by the eyebrows on the foreheads, evoked below by the wisely sketched curve of the noses and further down, by the double arc which masterfully outlines the lips and the double chin. Following a hypothetical vertical line down still further, we find another double arc outlining the breasts, and then, continuing down from the waist all along the skirts and ending in the ankles, we find almost at the bottom, a twisted double arc intended to represent the other side of the skirts. This detail serves, above all, to eliminate a certain hieratic fixedness, which was relatively common in the Khmer statues of lesser quality.

Archeological exploration

Ever since 1864, when France established a Protectorate in Cambodia, Western travellers have been amazed by the impressive ruins of Angkor. Not long after, once the École française d'Extrême-Orient began to study and catalogue the findings made at the excavations, the growing number of scholars from all around the world, art lovers and admirers of this sculpture, became fervent proponents of Khmer Art.

“Khmer Art, captivating in its civility, refinement and delight, open to all forms of life, is made in the image of the country and its inhabitants. Nevertheless, among the arts of the Far East, few are as accessible to the Western temperament. Its profound beauty impresses itself upon the spirit and sensibility without requiring prior study. Its sobriety, its horror of excess and its sense of balance and harmony allow it to attain universal value.” Thus wrote Madeleine Giteau, the distinguished member of the École française d’Extrême-Orient, in the introduction to her book Les Khmers in 1965. 

Currently, the largest museums of the West dedicate entire halls to Khmer sculpture, not to mention the enormous exhibition which took place first at the Galeries Nationales du Grand Palais in Paris and later at the National Gallery of Art in Washington in 1997.

Gallery

See also
Architecture of Cambodia
Angkor Wat
Khmer Empire
Angkor
Culture of Cambodia
Visual arts of Cambodia

General:
Sculpture
Eastern art history

References

Bibliography
 La espiritualidad del vacio, Khmer sculpture exhibition catalogue, Professor Matthias Barmann, Obrasocial Bancaja, Valencia, Spain.
Lord Umagangapatisvara Annette L. Heitmann, Published: November 21, 2005. Asian Art.
A Cambodian Masterpiece restored Jennifer Casler, September 2007. Apollo Magazine.
Khmer Art Doctor Heiner Hachmeister, Hachmeister Galerie, Munich, Germany.
Les Khmers, Sculptures Khmeres, reflets de la civilisation d'Angkor, Fribourg, Office du Livre. Madeleine Giteau, 1965.

External links

 Khmer Sculpture of Angkor and Ancient Cambodia Millennium of Glory, National Gallery of Art, Washington DC.
 Asia Society Museum, Southeast Asia, John D. Rockefeller 3rd Collection, New York.
 Angkor A Khmer Empire, Angkor Empire.

Sculpture
Asian art
Cambodian culture
 
Khmer Empire